Tropak or trepak is a traditional Ukrainian folk dance that spread throughout the Russian Empire.

The tropak shares many musical and choreographic characteristics with the better known hopak. Both developed as Cossack social dances, performed at celebratory occasions. The tropak differs from the hopak in chordal use and also in that the tempo gradually speeds up throughout the dance.

The tropak was one of the traditional instrumental dances played by blind itinerant musicians called kobzars on their banduras and kobzas. It was also one of the dances often included in the repertoire of village violinists in Eastern Ukraine.

In music
The dance is a brisk allegro in  time in a major key. Accompaniment is usually on two alternating chords; dominant and tonic.

One of its best known representations is Pyotr Ilyich Tchaikovsky's Trepak (also known as the Russian Dance) from the ballet The Nutcracker. The dance music was also used in the last movement of his Violin Concerto in D major, Op. 35. The third of Modest Mussorgsky's Songs and Dances of Death is named "Trepak".

In dance
Traditional Tropak choreography did not survive except a simple walk with a syncopated stamp, often done to a quick duple meter rhythm.

On So You Think You Can Dance (Season 4), Joshua Allen and Stephen "Twitch" Boss performed a Trepak routine, interpreted as a dance duel, in Week 9 (August 6, 2008).

See also
 Trepak (The Nutcracker)

References

  Humeniuk, Andriy (1962). Ukrainian Folk Dances (Українські Hароднi Танцi), Academy of Sciences of the Ukrainian SSR.
  Humeniuk, Andriy (1963). Folk Choreographic Art of Ukraine (Hароднe Xореографiчнe Mиcтeцтвo України), Academy of Sciences of the Ukrainian SSR.

Russian folk dances
Ukrainian folk dances